David Frigout (born 8 May 1973 in Lorient (Morbihan)), is a former French basketball player.

Biography
Currently living in Limoges, he now restores property, and runs two franchises of Subway in the same town.

Clubs
1990–1993: ALM Évreux Basket (Pro B)
1993–1995: Fullerton (NCAA I) 
1995–1998: ALM Évreux Basket (Pro A)
1998–2000: CSP Limoges (Pro A)
2000–2004: ASVEL Villeurbanne (Pro A) 
2004–2005: Spirou Charleroi (BLB)

Honours
Winner of the Coupe Korac in 2000 with Limoges
French Champions in 2000 with Limoges and in 2002 with ASVEL
Runner-up in French Championship in 2001 with ASVEL
Coupe de France: in 2000 with Limoges and in 2001 with ASVEL
5 caps for France.

References

External links
 Statistics at lnb.fr
Euroligue statistics

1973 births
Living people
ALM Évreux Basket players
ASVEL Basket players
Cal State Fullerton Titans men's basketball players
French expatriate basketball people in the United States
French men's basketball players
Limoges CSP players
Spirou Charleroi players
Sportspeople from Lorient
Centers (basketball)